Vålerenga is a neighborhood in the city of Oslo, Norway

Vålerenga may also refer to:

 Vålerengens Idrettsforening, a multi-sports club commonly referred to as Vålerenga or VIF
 Vålerenga Fotball, the association football department of VIF
 Vålerenga Fotball Damer, the ladies' football department
 Vålerenga Ishockey, the ice hockey department of VIF
 Vålerenga Trolls, the American football department of VIF
 Vålerenga Church, iconic church located at Vålerenga, Oslo